The 2009 Kentucky Derby was the 135th running of the Kentucky Derby. The value of the race was $2,177,000 in stakes. The race was sponsored by Yum! Brands and hence officially was called Kentucky Derby Presented by Yum! Brands. The race took place on May 2, 2009, and was televised in the United States on the NBC television network. The Atlanta-based Southern Tourism Society named the Kentucky Derby Festival, which was April 11 to May 1, as one of the top tourist attractions in the Southeast for the first half of 2009. The post time was 6:24 p.m. EDT (10:24 p.m. UTC). The official attendance at Churchill Downs was 153,563.

Results

The ending of the race came as a shock to those in attendance as Mine That Bird, trained by "Chip" Woolley Jr. and ridden by Calvin Borel, running dead last until the final turn, suddenly moved into the lead in the final furlong. He took the lead so fast after the final turn that NBC Sports race announcer Tom Durkin didn't notice the gelding and was still heatedly describing the performance of Pioneerof the Nile and Musket Man despite Mine That Bird already opening a three-length lead over the pack. Mine That Bird won by 6 lengths for the longest margin of victory in over 60 years. He was the longest-odds horse to win the Derby in over 85 years.

 Margins – 6 lengths, nose
 Time – 2:02.66
 Track – Sloppy (sealed)

Payout

The 135th Kentucky Derby Payout Schedule

 $1 Exacta: (8-16)  Paid  $1,037.30
 $1 Trifecta: (8-16-2)  Paid  $20,750.30
 $1 Superfecta: (8-16-2-7)  Paid  $278,503.20

Churchill Downs had scheduled their first futures wager pool for the year to begin on February 12, with two subsequent pools opening on March 12 and April 2. Offering 24 betting options (23 individual horses at odds ranging from 10–1 to 50–1, and an "All others" option at 5-2 odds), favorites include Capt. Candyman Can and Old Fashioned at 10–1, followed by Friesan Fire, Midshipman, Pioneerof the Nile, Stardom Bound, This Ones for Phil, and Vineyard Haven at 12–1.

After the starter draw for the running, I Want Revenge was installed as the 3-1 morning line favorite.  His scratch later in the morning marked the first time that the morning line favorite was scratched on the day of the race.

Friesan Fire, winner of the Louisiana Derby, started the race as the 19-5 (3.80-1) favorite.

The Field

Post positions were drawn Thursday, April 30, 2009.

I Want Revenge was scratched on the morning of the race because of lameness issues in the  colt's left front ankle. In addition, Quality Road, who had been an early favorite, was withdrawn from the race on April 27 because of a quarter crack in his right front hoof.

Notable achievements

 Longest winning margin since 1946 when Assault won by 8 lengths
 Calvin Borel is the first jockey since Jerry Bailey in 1993 to win the Kentucky Oaks and Kentucky Derby in the same year. Borel won the Kentucky Oaks aboard Rachel Alexandra
 Mine That Bird is the first Sovereign Award as champion two-year-old colt (2008) in Canada to win the Kentucky Derby since Sunny's Halo (1983)
 Mine That Bird winning odds of 50.60-1 was the second highest in Kentucky Derby history after  Donerail (1913) now third highest winning odds.

Subsequent Grade I wins
Mine That Bird never won another race, though he did finish second in the Preakness to Horse of the Year Rachel Alexandra. Several other horses went on to achieve Grade I success:
 General Quarters – Turf Classic Stakes in 2010.
 Summer Bird – Belmont Stakes, Travers Stakes, Jockey Club Gold Cup

Mr. Hot Stuff never won another race on the flat, but did become a notable steeplechaser. He won the Grade I A. P. Smithwick Memorial Steeplechase Stakes in 2013 and the American Grand National Hurdle Stakes in 2014.

Subsequent breeding careers
The most notable progeny of participants in the 2009 Derby are as follows.

Pioneerof the Nile (2nd)
 American Pharoah – 2015 Kentucky Derby, Preakness Stakes, Belmont Stakes, Haskell Invitational, Breeders' Cup Classic
 Classic Empire – Breeders' Cup Juvenile, Arkansas Derby. Second in Preakness Stakes
 Midnight Storm – Shoemaker Mile

Chief Party Officer

Building on the longstanding tradition of drinking, partying, and general revelry in the infield, Churchill Downs officials announced that they are accepting applications to be the second "Chief Party Officer." According to Chief Marketing Officer Dave Tompkins, "The non-stop revelry can test the most die-hard partiers, so a CPO candidate must be able to take the reins and lead our infield nation to new heights of fun and frivolity." In an effort to promote the position, Tim "Stymie" Snyder, the 2008 Chief Party Officer, attended Super Bowl XLIII to personally recruit applicants. The winner was announced March 6, and prizes include use of an RV (billed as a "luxurious boardroom on wheels") for the year. This year's Chief Party Officer is Nick Ferrara.

See also

 2009 Preakness Stakes
 2009 Belmont Stakes
 Kentucky Derby Challenge Stakes, an English Thoroughbred horse race intended to become an annual race, but was run only one time on March 18, 2009; winner was guaranteed one of the twenty starting spots at the Kentucky Derby but ended up not running in it

References

External links
 Kentucky Derby 135 official website

Kentucky Derby races
Kentucky Derby
Derby
May 2009 sports events in the United States